Oh. My. Gods. is a 2008 young adult fantasy novel by Tera Lynn Childs. The book follows the character of Phoebe, a young runner who discovers that the school she's attending is full of family and relatives of Greek gods and goddesses. Oh. My. Gods. was the winner of Romance Writers of America's 2009 RITA award for "Best First Book".

Plot summary
Phoebe is a perfectly happy senior at high school and headed for USC with her best friends after graduation. Everything changes when her Mom comes back to California announcing she is marrying a Greek man and they have plans to move there. They move to a secret island where she is accepted to an exclusive academy for the descendants of Greek gods, which is run by Phoebe's new stepfather. Phoebe doesn't really fit in, partly because she believes she's not of holy descent. Her new step-sister and others easily torment her, but Phoebe ignores them. At the school, she quickly befriends Nicole and Troy. Phoebe makes it onto her cross country team, running is her natural talent. Soon after, she gets swept up in controversies including her, Griffin, Nicole, Troy, Stella, and her dead dad. At the very end of the book, Phoebe finds out the biggest secret of her life: Phoebe is a descendant of Nike, the Goddess of Victory. She then proceeds to talk to Griffin, who tells her he was destined to be with a descendant of Nike. They start a relationship together.

Characters
Phoebe Castro, the main character in the book. Her mom gets married, and she has to move to Serfopoula, causing her world to be turned upside down. She has trouble adjusting to her new life.  
Nicole Matios, one of Phoebe's three friends. Nicole is hardcore and isn't afraid of anything.
Troy Travatas, a friend of Phoebe. He is the descendant from Asclepius. 
Griffin Blake, a boy from Phoebe's school that she likes. He is a descendant from Ares and Hercules from his father's side.
Valerie Petrolas, a therapist and Phoebe's mom. Her relationship with Phoebe went downhill after they moved out to Serfopoula.
Stella Petrolas, Phoebe's stepsister, who tries to make Phoebe's life miserable. Stella is part of the mean and popular clique at school. Likewise, she is a descendant from Hera.
Damian Petrolas, Phoebe's stepfather (marries Phoebe's mother near the beginning of the book) and Stella's father. He is also the headmaster of the school that Phoebe and Stella attend.

Reception
Reception for Oh. My. Gods. was positive, with the School Library Journal stating that the book "will keep teens, particularly girls, reading to find out if Phoebe will finally fit in, get her crush, and make the team." Publishers Weekly called the book's plot "a fun, fresh update" on a familiar theme.

References

2008 American novels
Young adult fantasy novels
American young adult novels
American fantasy novels
2008 fantasy novels
Classical mythology in popular culture
Novels set on islands
Novels set in Greece
Novels set in high schools and secondary schools